Carlos Casar (born 8 August 1960) is a Mexican bobsledder. He competed in the two man and the four man events at the 1992 Winter Olympics.

References

1960 births
Living people
Mexican male bobsledders
Mexican male long jumpers
Olympic bobsledders of Mexico
Bobsledders at the 1992 Winter Olympics
Athletes (track and field) at the 1987 Pan American Games
Place of birth missing (living people)
Pan American Games competitors for Mexico